The Bayard School in the Lawrenceville neighborhood of Pittsburgh, Pennsylvania is a building from 1874 and is one of Pittsburgh's oldest surviving school buildings. The school was closed in 1939, along with the nearby Foster School and Lawrence School, when all students were transferred to the new elementary wing of Arsenal Junior High School. It was sold in 1941 and later used as a warehouse.  It was listed on the National Register of Historic Places in 1986.

After being vacant for a number of years, the school building was renovated and converted into loft apartments in 2018.

References

External links
Photo of the school

School buildings on the National Register of Historic Places in Pennsylvania
Italianate architecture in Pennsylvania
School buildings completed in 1874
Schools in Pittsburgh
National Register of Historic Places in Pittsburgh
Lawrenceville (Pittsburgh)